The Central Coast AVA is a large American Viticultural Area in the U.S. state of California that spans from Santa Barbara County in the south to the San Francisco Bay Area in the north. The boundaries of the Central Coast include portions of six counties.  With around  planted to wine grapes, Chardonnay accounts for more than half of the total. Within this larger AVA are several smaller appellations that share the same cooling influence from the Pacific Ocean.

Counties 

Because U.S. county names automatically qualify as legal appellations of origin for wine, the following appellations do not require registration with the Alcohol and Tobacco Tax and Trade Bureau:
 Contra Costa County
 Monterey County
 San Luis Obispo County
 Santa Barbara County
 Santa Clara County

References

External links 
 California Central Coast AVA Wine Map
  TTB AVA Map

Geography of Contra Costa County, California
Geography of Monterey County, California
Geography of San Luis Obispo County, California
Geography of Santa Barbara County, California
Geography of Santa Clara County, California
Geography of Santa Cruz County, California
American Viticultural Areas of the San Francisco Bay Area
American Viticultural Areas
1985 establishments in California